The given name Kyril or Kyrill is male name, deriving from the Greek name Κύριλλος (Kýrillos) which in turn derives from Greek κύριος (kýrios) "lord".  There are many variant forms of the name: Cyril, Cyrill, Cy, Kiril, Kirill, Kiro, Kiryl, Kyryl, Kirillos, Kyrillo, Kyrylo. 

The name belongs to several religious figures known as Saint Cyril.

People with the given name
Kyril, Prince of Preslav

See also
Cyril

Masculine given names